Australobius sculpturatus is a species of centipedes in the family Lithobiidae. It is native to Maldives, Laccadive Islands, and Sri Lanka.

References

External links
An annotated checklist of centipedes (Myriapoda: Chilopoda) of Sri Lanka

sculpturatus
Animals described in 1901
Taxa named by R. I. Pocock